Laila (born 24 October 1980) is an Indian actress. She has acted predominantly in Tamil films, as well as few  Telugu, Malayalam, Kannada and Hindi language films.

Career

She made her debut in the Telugu film Egire Paavurama (1996), directed by S. V. Krishna Reddy. Laila began to receive offers from prominent directors to feature in Tamil films and turned down films such as Dharma Chakkaram and Kadhal Palli by K. S. Ravikumar and Pavithran respectively. She subsequently signed on to appear in the lead role in VIP after Pooja Kumar had walked out of the project. However, Laila was left unimpressed when the producer asked her to consider changing her stage name to Pooja, as the invitations for the film had already been printed, and furthermore, she revealed that she was unaware of Rambha also being a heroine in the film. Laila subsequently dropped out of the project, wanting to make her Tamil debut in a film where she played the sole heroine.

Laila then worked with Ajith in Dheena and Parthen Rasithen with Prashanth.

Then came Dhill and Pithamagan with Vikram. In between, Laila took a break and went back to Mumbai. However, she returned to Kollywood with a big bang. Her role in the movie Ullam Ketkumae won her accolades from the masses. She was one of the successful Tamil actresses for a brief time.

Laila has made a comeback to the Tamil entertainment industry. She first appeared in a ready-made flavored milk commercial (Aachi Badam Milk) post her sabbatical in 2018. She will be appearing as the judge for the dance show DJD Juniors on Zee Tamil alongside actresses Sudha Chandran and Sneha. She made her post-sabbatical film comeback with Sardar (2022).

Personal life

She married Mehdi, an Irani businessman, on 6 January 2006. She dated him for eight years before marriage. According to Laila, they were engaged for four years before marriage. The couple has two sons, aged 9 and 12. She is Goan and she is a Roman Catholic.

Filmography

Films

Television

Web series

References

External links

 Official Website

20th-century Indian actresses
Indian film actresses
Actresses in Kannada cinema
1980 births
Living people
Tamil Nadu State Film Awards winners
Actresses in Malayalam cinema
Filmfare Awards South winners
Actresses in Tamil cinema
Place of birth missing (living people)
International Tamil Film Award winners
Actresses in Hindi cinema
21st-century Indian actresses
Actresses from Mumbai
Actresses in Tamil television